Hutan Melintang (Jawi: هوتن ملينتڠ) is a mukim in Bagan Datuk District, Perak, Malaysia. The town is located next to the Strait of Malacca.

The majority of the population works in the fishing industry, which is one of the biggest in Malaysia. Jenderata Estate, owned by United Plantations, is also located nearby.

Most of the people here work as plantation workers, fishermen and farmers, as Hutan Melintang is the biggest fishing village in Perak.

History
The mukim used to be part of Hilir Perak District.

References

Bagan Datuk District
Mukims of Perak